In mathematical cryptography, a Kleinian integer is a complex number of the form , with m and n rational integers. They are named after Felix Klein.

The Kleinian integers form a ring called the Kleinian ring, which is the ring of integers in the imaginary quadratic field . This ring is a unique factorization domain.

See also

Eisenstein integer
Gaussian integer

References

 . (Review).

Quadratic irrational numbers
Ring theory